The Karlsruhe University of Arts and Design (HfG) is a state art college founded in 1992 in Karlsruhe. It focuses on media art, communication design , product design , exhibition design and scenography, art research and media philosophy with a strong interdisciplinarity between the departments. The university has about 400 students.

History 
The university was opened on 15 April 1992 as a reform college in Karlsruhe. Together with the Center for Art and Media Karlsruhe (ZKM) it was founded during the years 1989 to 1992 by Heinrich Klotz. This combination of teaching, research and exhibition institutions corresponds to the self-imposed artistic and pedagogical task of relating the traditional arts to media technology and electronic manufacturing processes.

Classical forms such as painting were only represented with a professorship until 2004. Interdisciplinary work should be promoted by linking artistic, applied and theoretical courses. With bringing together media art, art theory and design Klotz wanted to found an "electronic Bauhaus". Since 1997, the HfG Karlsruhe as well as the ZKM is housed in a listed former ammunition factory.

After the death of Klotz in 1999, Gunter Rambow took over the provisional management of the university. In early 2001, Peter Sloterdijk was appointed rector, which he remained until his retirement in 2015. After a transitional phase under Deputy Rector Volker Albus, Siegfried Zielinski's term of office began in February 2016. In December 2017 according to own information Zilinski asked the Minister of Science, Research and Art Baden-Württemberg for the early termination of his contract. As a reason, he stated that his reform ideas were not enforceable. Since 1 April 2018 Johan F. Hartle has taken over the position of acting Rector at the Karlsruhe University of Arts and Design.

Study 
The interdisciplinary framework of the early years is still being preserved by the four practical departments

 Exhibition Design and Scenography,
 Communication Design,
 Media Art and
 Product Design
as well as the theoretical department
 Art Research and Media Philosophy

Common to all degree courses is the project work practiced from the beginning, as well as continued cooperation with the neighboring ZKM. In-house workshops and studios were also set up for the practice-oriented training of the HfG students.

For the students of the theoretical subjects the choice of a practical secondary subject is obligatory. The students of the practical subjects are obliged to study a theory subject such as art research or media philosophy as a minor subject. The four practical study programs of the HfG Karlsruhe are permeable fields of study, which allow intensive connections to other subjects and, depending on the research and development focus of the specific university teacher, receive different emphases. The media-theoretical analysis permeates the practical events, on the other hand, the media-theoretical and art-research training is concretized by an immediate practical relevance.

Prerequisite for admission to the program is the general or subject-related higher education entrance qualification as well as the successful completion of an entrance examination.

Degree 
At the HfG Karlsruhe, no Bachelor/Master programs are offered, as from the first semester on the project study with contents that can not be modularized, is practiced. The HfG Karlsruhe still awards the internationally recognized diploma or Magister's degree. On the basis of the Magister's degree a doctorate (Dr. phil.) in art theory, media theory and philosophy is also possible. The international Bologna compatibility of HfG degrees is guaranteed. In 2008, the Wissenschaftsrat certified the HfG Karlsruhe an "excellent training concept" in its evaluation report.

Departments 
Name of the degree in brackets.

 Media art (Diploma) with the teaching areas
 Digital Art/InfoArt
 Movie
 Photography
 Sound
 3D-Laboratory
 Game-Lab
 Product design (Diploma)
 Communication Design (Diploma)
 Exhibition Design and Scenography (Diploma) with the teaching areas
 Scenography
 Exhibition Design
 Curatorial Studies and Dramaturgical Practice
 Art Research and Media Philosophy (Magister) with the teaching areas
 Art Research and Media Theory
 Philosophy and aesthetics

Professors
 Volker Albus (Product Design)
 Michael Bielicky (Info-Art/Digital Media)
 Anja Dorn (Curatorial Studies and Dramaturgical Practice)
 Omer Fast (Media Art)
 Johan Frederik Hartle (Art Research and Media Philosophy)
 Stephan Krass (Literary Art)
 Susanne Kriemann (Media Art/Artistic Photography)
 James Langdon (Communication Design)
 Urs Lehni (Communication Design)
 Andreas Müller (Exhibition Design)
 Matteo Pasquinelli (Media Philosophy)
 Răzvan Rădulescu (Film)
 Sereina Rothenberger (Communication Design)
 Heike Schuppelius (Scenography)
 Rebecca Stephany (Communication Design)
 João Tabarra (Media Art)

Former professors 
 Beatrix von Pilgrim (Scenography)
 Werner Aisslinger (Product Design)
 Hans Beller (Film)
 Hans Belting (Art Research)
 Martin Bohus (Media Art/Film)
 Michael Clegg (Artistic Photography)
 Didi Danquart (Media Art/Film)
 Thomas Heise (Media Art/Film)
 Louis Philippe Demers (Media Exhibition Design)
 Elger Esser (Media Art/Photography)
 Vadim Fishkin (New Media Art)
 Günther Förg (Painting)
 Chup Friemert (Design Theory and Design History)
 Ludger Gerdes † (Painting)
 Siegfried Gohr (Art Research and Media Philosophy)
 Markus Grob (Architecture)
 Götz Großklaus (Media History)
 Boris Groys (Philosophy and Media Theory)
 Byung-Chul Han (Philosophy and Media Theory)
 Candida Höfer (Media Art/Photography)
 Anna Jermolaewa (New Media Art)
 Isaac Julien (Media Art)
 Ines Kaag and Désirée Heiss (Designduo Bless) (Product Design)
 Dietmar Kamper † (Media Theory, Sociology and Philosophy)
 Dieter Kiessling (Media Art)
 Mischa Kuball (Media Art)
 Wilfried Kuehn (Exhibition Design und Curatorial Practice)
 Marie-Jo Lafontaine (Sculpture and Multimedia)
 Daniel Libeskind (Architecture)
 Armin Linke (Photography)
 Hansjerg Maier-Aichen (Product Design)
 Christian Möller (Exhibition Design)
 Marcel Odenbach (Media Art)
 Dietrich Oertel (Architecture)
 Jai Young Park (Sculpture and Multimedia)
 Florian Pfeffer (Communication Design)
 Tania Prill (Communication Design)
 Gunter Rambow (Visual Communication)
 Chris Rehberger (Communication Design)
 Manfred Reichert (Music)
 Edgar Reitz (Film)
 Lois Renner (Media Art/Photography)
 Peter Anselm Riedl (Art Research)
 Wolfgang Rihm (Composition)
 Rolf Sachsse (Theories of Design)
 Michael Saup (Media Art/Digital Media)
 Michael Schirner (Communication Design)
 Helmut Schuster † (Painting)
 Johannes Schütz (Scenography)
 Michael Simon (Scenography)
 Peter Sloterdijk (Philosophy)
 Lothar Spree (Media Art/Film)
 Thomas Struth (Media Art/Photography)
 Andrei Ujică (Film)
 Ulay (Uwe Laysiepen, Media Art)
 Wolfgang Ullrich (Art Research and Media Philosophy)
 Klaus vom Bruch (Media Art)
 Stephan von Huene † (Media Art)
 Sven Voelker (Communication Design)
 Peter Voß (Media)
 Penelope Wehrli (Scenography)
 Hannes Wettstein † (Product Design)
 Beat Wyss (Art Research and Media Philosophy)
 James Irvine (Product Design)

References

External links
  

1992 establishments in Germany
Art schools in Germany
Design schools in Germany
Educational institutions established in 1992
Karlsruhe University of Arts and Design